Houston station is an Amtrak intercity train station in Houston, Texas.

History
The present Houston station, which opened on October 26, 1959, was built by the Southern Pacific Railroad to replace Grand Central Station, which was just east of the present station. That station operated from September 1, 1934 until the property was sold to the U.S. Government in 1959 to become the site of the Houston main post office. Grand Central Station had replaced the original Houston & Texas Central depot of 1886. When Amtrak was created it was one of two stations in Houston that served Amtrak trains, the other being Union Station, now part of Minute Maid Park. All Amtrak trains moved to Southern Pacific Station by the end of July 1974, and all trains were canceled or rerouted out of Houston except the Sunset Limited. The station continued to be owned and operated by the Southern Pacific Railroad after the creation of Amtrak, and it has been owned and operated by the Union Pacific Railroad, who bought out Southern Pacific.

It was no longer an active passenger station by the end of 1958 and never served Amtrak. It was demolished, save for a section of platform under the Main Street viaduct.

Intermodal Transit Center

Whenever the funding would become available, the current Amtrak station was to be replaced by the Houston Intermodal Transit Center, just north of downtown, on the Union Pacific main line. It was planned to be a much larger facility with the tracks on a lower level, similar to Penn Station in New York.  The project was cancelled in 2010.

Connections
Amtrak Thruway motorcoach connection to the Texas Eagle at Longview station
Metropolitan Transit Authority of Harris County, Texas (METRO) bus service
Connections to Greyhound Lines service

See also

 Transportation in Houston

References

External links

Houston Amtrak Station (USA Rail Guide -- Train Web)

Amtrak stations in Texas
Railway stations in Houston
Railway stations in the United States opened in 1959
Former Southern Pacific Railroad stations
Economy of Houston
Amtrak Thruway Motorcoach stations in Texas
Railway stations in Harris County, Texas